The Canadian federal budget ’for fiscal year 1994-1995 was presented by Minister of Finance Paul Martin in the House of Commons of Canada on 22 February 1994. It was the first federal budget under the premiership of Jean Chrétien.

Background
The budget is tabled only a few months after the 1993 Canadian federal election in which the Liberal Party led by Jean Chrétien received a large majority of the seats in the House of Commons. Paul Martin, Chrétien's main rival in the 1990 Liberal Party leadership election was appointed Minister of Finance.

Taxes

Expenditures

Transfers to provinces
The budget announced the freezing of Canada Assistance Plan (CAP) payments to their 1994-95 levels after March 31, 1995. Unlike the 1990 restrictions, all provinces (including those receiving equalization payments) are affected by the cap.

The Reform Party (then the third party by number of seats in the House) supported reductions to the CAP while criticizing that the cutbacks are not matched by amendments to health national standards to give more freedom to provinces in adjusting the services they provide.

Legislative history 
Votes followed party lines with the notable exception of independent Québec MP Gilles Bernier (Beauce) voting in favor.

External links 
 Budget Speech
 Budget Plan
 Budget in Brief

References

Canadian budgets
1994 in Canadian law
1994 government budgets
1994 in Canadian politics